Kicking Horse may refer to:
Kicking Horse River in the Canadian Rockies, southeastern British Columbia, Canada

Kicking Horse Mountain Resort, named after the canyon
Kicking Horse Pass in the Canadian Rockies
Kicking Horse, Montana, a census-designated place in Lake County, Montana, United States
Kicking Horse Dam and Reservoir, in Lake County, Montana, United States
The Kicking Horse coffee brand in Canada, now owned by Lavazza